During the 1990–91 English football season, Aston Villa competed in the Football League First Division.

A season after finishing as runners-up, Villa dropped to 17th in the table following the departure of manager Graham Taylor, who took charge of the England national football team. Manager Jozef Vengloš left after just season in charge, and was replaced by Sheffield Wednesday's Ron Atkinson.

Final league table

Results

First Division

UEFA Cup

FA Cup

League Cup

First-team squad
Squad at end of season

Left club during season

Reserves and academy

Reserves
The following players spent most of the season playing for the reserve team, and did not appear for the senior team.

Youth
The following players spent most of the season playing for the youth team, but may have also appeared for the reserve team.

Schoolboys
The following players were attached to the club but did not play for the reserve or youth teams.

References

External links
Aston Villa official website
avfchistory.co.uk 1990–91 season

Aston Villa F.C. seasons
Aston Villa